Nuno Viriato Tavares de Melo Egídio (Tomar, 18 February 1922 – Lisbon, 7 December 2011) was a Portuguese general.

He served as Governor of Macau from 1979 to 1981. He was also head of the Armed Forces General Staff from 1981 to 1984.

References

2011 deaths
Portuguese generals
Governors of Macau
1922 births
People from Tomar